J. R. Kratos (born June 20, 1982) is an American professional wrestler. He currently appears for New Japan Pro-Wrestling, where he is a member of Team Filthy. He also wrestled for the National Wrestling Alliance (NWA) where he is a former holder of the NWA World Tag Team Championship.

Professional wrestling career

Early career

National Wrestling Alliance 
On November 11, 2020, Aron Stevens and Kratos defeated Eli Drake and James Storm to win the NWA World Tag Team Championship. On June 6, at When Our Shadows Fall, Stevens and Kratos successfully defended their titles in a three-way tag team match against The War Kings (Jax Dane and Crimson) and Strictly Business (Thom Latimer and Chris Adonis). On August 29, at the NWA 73rd Anniversary Show, they lost the titles to La Rebelión (Bestia 666 and Mecha Wolf 450). On December 4, at Hard Times 2, Stevens and Kratos failed to beat The OGK (Matt Taven and Mike Bennett) for the ROH World Tag Team Championship.

New Japan Pro-Wrestling 

On November 6, 2020 episode of NJPW Strong, Kratos made his NJPW debut teaming with Rust Taylor to defeat Jeff Cobb and Rocky Romero. During the match Tom Lawlor was spotted by Kevin Kelly. Before Lawlor's match with Fred Rosser, it was confirmed that he aligned himself with Kratos and Taylor forming the New Japan version of Team Filthy. Lawlor stated that he teamed up with Kratos and Taylor because he was looking for a fight team that would be the strongest ever seen. Just one week after their formation, Danny Limelight would turn on Romero and join Team Filthy. Together, Team Filthy was victorious against Cobb, Romero, Rosser, and P. J. Black in an eight-man tag team match.

Championships and accomplishments
All Pro Wrestling
APW Universal Heavyweight Championship (2 times)
Gold Rush Pro Wrestling
GRPW Heavyweight Championship (1 time)
GRPW Tag Team Championship (1 time) – with Colt Stevens
National Wrestling Alliance
NWA World Tag Team Championship (1 time) – with Aron Stevens
PREMIER Wrestling
PREMIER Heavyweight Championship (1 time)
 Pro Wrestling Revolution
PWR World Heavyweight Championship (1 time)
Supreme Pro Wrestling
SPW Heavyweight Championship (3 times)
Pro Wrestling Illustrated
Ranked No. 124 of the top 500 singles wrestlers in the PWI 500 in 2021

References

External links
 

1982 births
Living people
People from Pacifica, California
American male professional wrestlers
Professional wrestlers from California
20th-century American people
21st-century American people
NWA World Tag Team Champions
Sportspeople from the San Francisco Bay Area